Miliza Elizabeth Korjus  (August 18, 1909(?) – August 26, 1980) was a Polish-Estonian coloratura soprano opera singer, who later appeared in Hollywood films during the Golden Age and in Mexican films during the Golden Age too. Korjus became a naturalized United States citizen in her adulthood. She was nominated for the Academy Award for Best Supporting Actress in 1938 for her performance in The Great Waltz.

Early life
Korjus was born in Warsaw, Poland (then part of the former Russian Empire), the daughter of Anna (née Gintowt) and Artur Korjus, an Estonian lieutenant colonel in the Imperial Russian Army and later chief of staff to the war minister of independent Estonia. Her mother was descended from the Lithuanian-Polish nobility. Korjus' birth year has been reported as uncertain, and ranges from 1900 to 1909 according to various sources. Her daughter, Melissa Wells, claims the year was 1909 and that her mother knew such. Korjus was born in Warsaw during her father's military posting there, later the family moved to Moscow. Korjus was the fifth of six children; she had a brother and four sisters. Her mother and father separated sometime between 1912 and the Russian Revolution of 1917 — and in 1918, she moved from Moscow to Kyiv with her mother and sisters, where she began her musical training.

Career
As a teenager, Korjus toured the Soviet Union with a dumka choir. In 1927, while performing in Saint Petersburg (then Leningrad), she managed to clandestinely cross the international border into Estonia, where she was reunited with her father. She then began touring the Baltic countries and Germany, and in 1929, married Kuno Foelsch (1894–1965), a physicist. Korjus continued her concert career as a soprano in Germany and was eventually engaged by the Berlin State Opera in 1933. Her operatic appearances and recordings quickly propelled her to the forefront of European singers and earned her the nicknames "The Berlin Nightingale" and "Gorgeous Korjus". Irving Thalberg, head of production at Metro-Goldwyn-Mayer Studios, heard her recordings and signed her to a ten-year film contract, sight unseen. She arrived with her husband and daughter in the U.S. in March 1936. She studied singing with Estelle Liebling in New York City.

Her sole film for MGM was The Great Waltz (1938), which Frank Nugent of The New York Times called "a showcase for Miliza Korjus" while also noting her resemblance to Mae West. She was nominated for the Academy Award for Best Supporting Actress for the role. Korjus was scheduled to star in a film version of the novel Sandor Rozsa in 1940, but an automobile accident caused her leg to be crushed, and although she avoided amputation, she required extensive recuperation, causing the film to be canceled. Her contract with MGM was subsequently terminated.

By 1941, she had healed well enough to begin a tour of Latin America. During the tour, the United States became involved in World War II, and she decided to stay in Mexico for the duration. While living there, she made the Spanish-language film Caballería del Imperio. In 1944, Korjus returned to the United States, where she performed at Carnegie Hall. She toured the country for several more years, eventually settling in Los Angeles, California. She later founded Venus Records to release many of her earlier recordings.

Personal life
In 1952, she married Walter Shector (1925–1973), a Canadian-born physician, and retired from the concert stage, preferring to concentrate on making records. She died of heart failure in 1980 at Culver City, California. She was interred in the Westwood Village Memorial Park Cemetery in Los Angeles. She was survived by her two sons, Ernest (born 1943) and Richard (born 1946) and her daughter Melissa Foelsch (later Melissa Wells). Her daughter was born in Estonia in 1932, and served, for more than forty years, as a career officer of the U.S. foreign service. Wells served as U.S. ambassador to Estonia from 1998 to 2001.

Recordings
Miliza Korjus Collector's Edition: 4-CD set issued by Korjus Recordings. Contains all digitally re-mastered recordings made in Europe and USA, plus live concert performances. Ordering information can be found at the Official Website for Miliza Korjus
Miliza Korjus I: arias and excerpts from Die Zauberflöte, Le toréador, La zingara, Lucia di Lammermoor, Ernani, Rigoletto, I vespri siciliani, Mireille, Dinorah, The Tales of Hoffmann, Lakmé, Sadko, The Tsar's Bride, The Golden Cockerel, Proch: Tema e variazioni, CD 89054 (Preiser Lebendige Vergangenheit)
Miliza Korjus II: arias and excerpts from Die Entführung aus dem Serail, The Barber of Seville, Rigoletto, Lakmé, also songs by Delibes, Moszkowski, Weber, Chopin, Johann Strauss II, Alyabyev, Arditi, Denza, Rossini, Taubert, Muller, Mackeben, CD 89169 (Preiser Lebendige Vergangenheit)
Miliza Korjus III: arias and excerpts from works by Johann Strauss II, Mozart, Bellini etc. CD 896795 (Preiser Lebendige Vergangenheit)
Miliza Korjus - The Berlin Nightingale CD 727031918622 (Pearl)
’’Vienna in 3/4 Time - Miliza Korjus, Coloratura Soprano with Orchestra’’, LP RCA Camden CAL-427 (1958)

References and notes
Date of birth confirmed by Miliza's daughter, Ambassador Melissa Wells, 11/23/2019.

External links
 Official Website
 
 Opera Fresh article, January 14, 2011; accessed May 8, 2013.

1909 births
1980 deaths
American film actresses
American operatic sopranos
American people of Estonian descent
American people of Polish descent
People from Warsaw Governorate
Musicians from Warsaw
Burials at Westwood Village Memorial Park Cemetery
20th-century Estonian women opera singers
20th-century American actresses
20th-century American women opera singers
Naturalized citizens of the United States